Digora (Digoræ) is a town and the administrative center of Digorsky District of the Republic of North Ossetia–Alania, Russia, located on the Ursdon River (left tributary of the Terek),  northwest of the republic's capital Vladikavkaz. As of the 2010 Census, its population was 10,856.

History
Founded in 1852 as the aul of Volno-Khristianovsky and later renamed the selo of Novokhristianovskoye and Khristianovskoye, it was finally given its present name in 1934. It was granted town status in 1964.

Administrative and municipal status
Within the framework of administrative divisions, Digora serves as the administrative center of Digorsky District. As an administrative division, it is incorporated within Digorsky District as Digora Town Under District Jurisdiction. As a municipal division, Digora Town Under District Jurisdiction is incorporated within Digorsky Municipal District as Digorskoye Urban Settlement.

References

Notes

Sources

External links

Official website of Digora 
Digora Business Directory 

Cities and towns in North Ossetia–Alania